Leah Krinsky is an American comedy writer and producer. She is a two-time Primetime Emmy Award winner and a two-time Writers Guild of America Award winner. She has written for Dennis Miller Live, for which she won an Emmy in 1998.

Filmography
Funny Ladies - Volume 3 (2004)

References

External links

American comedy writers
Year of birth missing (living people)
Living people
Emmy Award winners
Place of birth missing (living people)